Shin'ichi or Shinichi (しんいち, シンイチ) is a masculine Japanese given name. Shin and ichi are separated and it is pronounced .

Possible writings
Different kanji that are pronounced  are combined with the kanji for " to give different names:
真一, "true, one"
信一, "belief, one"
伸一, "extend, one"
進一, "progress, one"
新一, "new, one"
慎一, "humility, one"
晋一, "advance, one"
紳一, "gentleman, one"
鎮一, "tranquilize, one"
愼一, "care, one"

People with the name
Shinichi Aoki (紳一, born 1965), Japanese professional Go player
Shinichi Chiba (真一), also known as Sonny Chiba, a Japanese actor
Shinichi Fujimura (新一, born 1950), Japanese amateur archaeologist
, Japanese Zen Buddhist scholar, philosopher and tea master
, Japanese ice hockey player
Shinichi Hoshi (新一, 1926–1997), Japanese novelist and science fiction writer
, Japanese physician and writer
Shin'ichi Ishiwata (信一), Japanese scientist
Shinichi Itoh (真一, born 1966), Japanese professional Grand Prix motorcycle road racer
, Japanese ice hockey player
Shinichi Kitaoka (伸一, born 1948), Japanese professor of political science
Shinichi Mori (進一, born 1947), Japanese enka singer
, Japanese cyclist
, Japanese baseball player
, Japanese footballer
, Japanese shogi player
Shinichi Sekizawa (新一, 1921–1992), Japanese screenwriter
Shinichi Shinohara (信一, born 1973), Japanese judoka
Shinichi Suzuki (violinist) (鎮一, 1898–1998), Japanese violinist
Suzuki Shin'ichi I (真一, 1835–1918), Japanese photographer
Suzuki Shin'ichi II (真一, 1855–1912), Japanese photographer
, Japanese ski jumper
, Japanese photographer
, Japanese modern pentathlete
Shinichi Tsutsumi (真一, born 1964), Japanese stage and screen actor
Shinichi Watanabe (慎一, born 1964), Japanese anime director
Wakakirin Shinichi (真一, born 1983), Japanese sumo wrestler
Shinichi Osawa (伸一, born 1967), Japanese pop artist
Shinichi Ishihara (born 1960), anison singer and anime voice actor
Shinichi Morishita (born 1960), Japanese football player
Shinichi Shuto (born 1983), Japanese football player

Fictional characters
Shinichi Kudō (新一) in the US Version named Jimmy Kudo, the main protagonist of the anime and manga series Case Closed (Detective Conan)
Shin'ichi Akiyama, the male protagonist of the manga Liar game
Shin'ichi Chiaki, the male protagonist of the manga Nodame Cantabile
Shinichi Izumi, the protagonist of the anime and manga series Parasyte
Shinichi Kuruma, The protagonist of the anime and manga series Majuu Sensen
Shinichi Nagata, a recurring character in Sword Art Online.
Shinichi, kitsune antagonist in the trilogy of books The Vampire Diaries: The Return
Shinichi Namura is a character in Marmalade Boy. He is Meiko's teacher and secret lover in the manga and anime series. 
Shinichi Sakurai, the male protagonist of Uzaki-chan Wants to Hang Out! 
Shin'ichi Susuki, the protagonist of YOU and ME and HER: A Love Story

Japanese masculine given names